Hyperolius bobirensis is a species of frog in the family Hyperoliidae.
It is endemic to Ghana.
Its natural habitats are subtropical or tropical moist lowland forests and intermittent freshwater marshes.
It is threatened by habitat loss.

References

bobirensis
Endemic fauna of Ghana
Amphibians described in 1967
Taxonomy articles created by Polbot